Live Wires is a 1946 film starring the comedy team of The Bowery Boys.  It is the first film in the series, which lasted until 1958 and included forty-eight films, after the comedy team of the East Side Kids was revamped and renamed The Bowery Boys.

The last entry in the series was In the Money, which was released by Allied Artists in 1958.

Plot
Slip Mahoney has trouble keeping a job. Each one he finds leads to an altercation and he loses it, disappointing his sister whom he lives with. Eventually Sach helps him obtain a job with the District Attorney where he finds some success. Through a series of events, Slip and Sach help capture several notorious gangsters, including one that was about to flee the country with his sister.

Cast

The Bowery Boys
 Leo Gorcey as Terrance 'Slip' Mahoney
 Huntz Hall as Sach
 Bobby Jordan as Bobby
 William Benedict as Whitey
 William Frambes as Homer

Remaining cast
 Pamela Blake as Mary Mahoney
 Claudia Drake as Jeannette
 Mike Mazurki as Patsy Clark
 Patti Brill as Mabel
 John Eldredge as Herbert L. 'Pigeon' Sayers
 Bernard Gorcey as Jack Kane

Notes
Gorcey's father, Bernard Gorcey, made his first appearance in the series, as a small-time bookmaker. It was not until the next film, In Fast Company where he takes on the role of Louie, the Sweet Shop owner. Louie's Sweet Shop is featured in this film however.

This was Frambes' only film as a Bowery Boy. He had previously played a rival gang member in the East Side Kids film Clancy Street Boys.

Home media
Warner Archives released the film on made-to-order DVD in the United States as part of "The Bowery Boys, Volume One" on November 23, 2012.

References

External links 
 
 
 
 

1946 films
Bowery Boys films
Monogram Pictures films
Films directed by Phil Karlson
American black-and-white films
American comedy-drama films
1946 comedy-drama films
1940s English-language films
1940s American films